Žarėnai is a town in Telšiai County, Lithuania. According to the 2022 census, the town has a population of 900 people.

History
During World War II, 40 Jewish families are deported from this city. Other Jews are massacred in a mass execution on December 23, 1941, perpetrated by Lithuanians nazis.

References

Towns in Lithuania
Towns in Telšiai County
Telšiai District Municipality
Duchy of Samogitia
Telshevsky Uyezd
Holocaust locations in Lithuania